Outlier is a Norwegian eight-part television crime drama, which premiered on November 18, 2020 on HBO Nordic. In Australia it was broadcast on SBS-TV's streaming service, On Demand from April 2, 2021. Outlier was created and scripted by Kristine Berg and Arne Berggren. Berg and Berggren co-directed all episodes, assisted by Ken Are Bongo as co-director for three episodes. It was filmed in Troms and Finnmark regions from July 2020 for Shuuto Arctic and distributed by REinvent. Outliers main protagonist, Maja Angell (Hanne Mathisen Haga) investigates the murder of a young woman, who was found in Maja's fictitious home village, Nerbygd, northern Norway (near actual town, Bardufoss). Nerbygd police chief, Johan (Stein Bjørn) quickly arrests a suspect – case closed. Maja believes police have the wrong man and returns to Nerbygd to determine whether the perpetrator is a serial killer.

Plot 

Kautokeino resident Elle finds fellow villager Sofie's mobile phone by the side of the road. Sofie is later found dead in Nerbygd's caravan park. Later, Elle tries to hand the phone to the police but they don't want it. London-based criminal psychologist Maja follows the case online. After local police chief, Johan arrests a suspect, Maja believes he is innocent as his past record is for violent but impulsive crimes; he would not have planned to kidnap a girl, take her to a caravan site, girl her, stage the body and leave the scene clean and tidy. To be so precise suggests to Maja the killer has practiced. Maja suspects an organized serial killer is at work. 

She travels to Nerbygd and starts her own investigation. Initially dismissive of Maja's theories, having eventually extracted a 'confession' from the suspect, Nerbygd police consider the case closed. Maja seeks help from her retired journalist father Anders, who directs her to newspaper archivist Dan. The police eventually agree to hand over files of old cases in case the killer is 'experienced' and they have missed his activity in the past through oversight / assuming women had left the country.

From the files, Dan and Maja identify several "soft targets" – loner females with little family support – who disappeared in previous years with no substantial investigation. When one such historical victim, Tina, is found dead, Johan's second-in-charge, Erik hesitantly assists Maja. 

Meanwhile Bardufoss resident Trond is North Security's field operative. He  installs and checks cameras and alarms across northern Norway, Finland and Sweden. He uses his skills (and installed cameras) to stalk, kidnap and kill victims. Initially, we do not see him attack anyone but watch him viewing private camera footage. He has a wife and child.

Elle does not get on with her father and leaves home. She starts work as one of several young house-keepers at a hotel in the next town.

Twenty years earlier Maja's brother Petter died in a car accident (suicide is mentioned earlier when Maja sits by his grave). At that time, ten-year old Maja had also been molested, but it was not taken seriously and she was told she Was having nightmares. She must then have repressed her memories of that time. When, in the present, Maja displays increasing confusion over the killer's victims and her childhood traumas she is excluded from the investigations. 

Elle trails Sofie's work history as a motel maid. Elle follows the trail to Nerbygd, but is dismissed by both Johan and a now distraught Maja. While returning home, Elle is kidnapped by Trond and held in an obscured forest hut. Maja is re-instated to help find Elle. Maja determines Trond is the killer and, with Erik and police, attempts to capture him.

Cast

Main cast 

 Hanne Mathisen Haga as Maja Angell: criminal psychologist, PhD candidate, lecturer at a London university, Petter's younger sister, Petter died 20 years earlier when Maja was 10
  as Anders Angell: Kathrine's husband, Petter and Maja's father, retired Nerbygd newspaper editor
 Stein Bjørn as Johan: Nerbygd police chief, investigates Sofie's death, dismissive of Maja's analyses as too far-fetched
 Jonas Delerud as Erik: Nerbygd police officer, Johan's second-in-charge, initially sceptical of Maja's ideas
 Kim-Runar Klodiussen as Dan Robin: Nerbygd newspaper archivist, assists Maja's investigations
 Eila Ballovara Varsi as Elle Jannok: Kautokeino resident, young woman, raised by father, helps with farm chores, leaves to learn about Sofie's disappearance and murder
 Marius Lien as Trond Kverntagen: North Security manager, field operative, married to Anna with daughter Lilya

Additional cast 

  as Kathrine Angell: Maja's mother, unresponsive, possibly demented, nursing home resident
 Benjamin Noble as Edward: London university psychology professor, Maja's tutor and boyfriend, concerned over her involvement in Sofie's murder case
  as Eivind Salomonsen: Maja's cousin, Petter's contemporary, North Security board member with Rune Mosli
 Kristine Myhre Tunheim as Anne-Li: Eivind's wife, dislikes Maja, warns him to avoid her
 Anethe Alfsvaag as Anna: Trond's wife, Lilya's mother
 Ella Maren Alfsvåg Jørgensen as Lilya: Anna and Trond's daughter
  as "old police deputy" (Gunnar Enoksen): former Nerbygd police chief, dismissive of Maja's concerns over historical disappearances, such as Tina's
 Viktor Enoksen as Skorpa: Nerbygd police officer, assists Johan and Erik
 Trude Øines as Emma: reported her friend, Tina Danielsen, as missing in 2008
 Johannes Y. Meløe as Roy Eliassen: 27-year-old man, violent, drug-related criminal, suspect in Sofie's murder
 Anne Katrine Haugen as "Roy's mother": uncooperative with police, talks to Maja
 Geir Gulbrandsen as "Roy's lawyer" (Jensberg): allows Maja access to Roy
 Cora Fransisca Karlberg as "maid" Billie: works at Djupelv hotel, inducts Elle
 Zoe Winther Hansen as "maid" Lilly: works at Djupelv hotel
 Pernille Sandøy as Sofie: Kautokeino resident, 19-year-old friend of Elle, found dead in Nerbygd caravan
 Egil Keskitalo as "Elle's father": reindeer herder, strict, work-focussed
 Anna Karoline Bjelvin as Anine Karlssen: hires North Security, has faulty surveillance camera
 Ola Karlsen as "jogger": reported as missing near recently burned-down building close to Dividalen
 Hans Kristian Elvenes as "power plant boss" (Odd Knut Sandbakken): Johan's friend, cuts power in specific regions over time as "stress test" for electricity supply
 Ingá Ánne Márjá Bongo as Sofie's sister: younger sister, befriends Elle
 Sara Inga Utsi Bongo as Sofie's mother: uninterested in Sofie's whereabouts
 Marie Charlotte Thomsen Lund as "nurse": looks after Kathrine at nursing home
 Espen Olaisen as "IT-expert" (Bjørnar Michaelsen): runs Webconsult which houses North Security's website
 Marja Kivenmäki as "receptionist Finland": tells Maja that Nerbygd police never asked for CCTV footage
 Christian Lindholm as "farmer": owns Morholt dairy farm

Episode guide

References

External links

2020s Norwegian television series
2020 Norwegian television series debuts
HBO Europe original programming
Television shows set in Norway